Thiruvottiyur is a state assembly constituency in Chennai district in Tamil Nadu. Its State Assembly Constituency number is 10. It consists of a portion of Tiruvottiyur taluk. It falls under Chennai North Lok Sabha constituency. It is one of the 234 State Legislative Assembly Constituencies in Tamil Nadu in India. Elections and winners in the constituency are listed below.

Madras State

Tamil Nadu 

  Assassinated or died in office

Election results

2021

2016

2011

2006

2001

1996

1991

1989

1984

1980

1977

1971

1967

References 

 

Assembly constituencies of Tamil Nadu
Tiruvallur district